Sir George Phillippo (1833 – 16 February 1914) was Chief Justice of Hong Kong in the late 19th century. He often attended the Legislative Council of Hong Kong sittings from around 1884 to 1888.

Early life and education

Phillippo was born in Spanish Town, St Catherine's, Jamaica in 1833, the son of Rev. James Phillippo and Hannah Elizabeth Cecil. He went to school in England, trained as a barrister and was called to the Bar in 1862. He did not practise law in England at that time, but returned to Jamaica, where he married Mary Clark, the daughter of Rev. John Clark, a colleague of his father in 1862. Mary's sister Hannah was married to George's brother James.

Legal practice

In 1862 George was called to the Jamaican Bar and, although he did practise law in Jamaica, within a few years he began an illustrious career with the British government and took up appointments in many parts of the world. His wife Mary died 16 April 1890. Later in 1890 he married Eliza Hughes, daughter of Thomas Hughes while in London.

Some highlights of his career:
	
 Barrister-at-Law, Inner Temple, 1862
 Admitted to the Jamaica Bar, 1862
 Queen's Advocate, Sierra Leone 1868
 Commissioner then Attorney-General of British Columbia, 1870
 Member of the Legislative Council of the Colony of British Columbia, 1871
 Puisne Judge, British Guiana, 1872
 Puisne Judge of Straits Settlements, 1874–76
 Attorney General of Hong Kong, 1876–79
 Chief Justice of Gibraltar, 1879–82
 Knighted, 1882
 Chief Justice of Hong Kong, 1882–88
 Has Perak medal
 Retired from the Colonial Service, 5 October 1888
 Returned to private law practice, 1888–97
 Appointed Her Majesty's Consul at Geneva, 1897

Retirement and death

He retired from Colonial Service as Chief Justice of Hong Kong on 5 October 1888. In 1897 he was appointed as the British High Consul in Geneva, Switzerland.

After he retired from public life in 1910 he decided to remain in Geneva and it was there he died on 16 February 1914. His funeral was conducted at the English Church in Geneva.

External links
 Portraits of Phillipo's second wife, Eliza

References

 Burke's Peerage, 1906
 Minutes of the Vancouver Island Legislative Council, 1871
 Minutes of the Hong Kong and Territories Legislative Council 1882-88

Chief Justices of the Supreme Court of Hong Kong
1833 births
1914 deaths
19th-century Jamaican lawyers
People from Spanish Town
British Malaya lawyers
Attorneys General of British Columbia
Attorneys General of Hong Kong
Members of the Legislative Assembly of British Columbia
British diplomats
British Hong Kong judges
Place of birth missing
Chief justices of Gibraltar
Straits Settlements judges
British Guiana judges
British colonial attorneys general in the Americas
Members of the Legislative Council of British Columbia
Jamaican people of English descent
19th-century Gibraltarian judges